Marko Krajcer (born 6 June 1985) is a Slovenian footballer who plays for SC Weiz.

References

External links
PrvaLiga profile 

1985 births
Living people
Slovenian footballers
Association football defenders
NK Dravograd players
NK Aluminij players
NK Celje players
NK Krško players
Slovenian PrvaLiga players
Slovenian Second League players
Slovenian expatriate footballers
Expatriate footballers in Austria
Slovenian expatriate sportspeople in Austria
Slovenia youth international footballers